Thomas Strengberger (born 5 October 1975) is a former professional tennis player from Austria.

Career
A doubles specialist, Strengberger had the best performance of his career at the 1997 Austrian Open, where he and partner Thomas Buchmayer were surprise finalists, having entered the tournament as wildcards. They upset the top seeded pairing of Luis Lobo and Andrei Olhovskiy in the semi-final, but were unable to defeat Wayne Arthurs and Richard Fromberg in the decider. The Austrian did well at his home event again in 2001, making the quarter-finals, this time with Wolfgang Schranz as his partner.

Strengberger appeared in two Davis Cup ties for Austria during his career. In 1998, he and Schranz won a doubles rubber over Kenneth Carlsen and Frederik Fetterlein. Two years later, with Austria now in the World Group, Strengberger teamed up with Julian Knowle for their doubles rubber against France. The French duo, Olivier Delaître and Nicolas Escudé, proved too strong.

ATP career finals

Doubles: 1 (0–1)

Challenger titles

Doubles: (8)

References

External links
 
 
 

1975 births
Living people
Austrian male tennis players